Pedreira (Portuguese for quarry) is a municipality in the state of São Paulo in Brazil. It is part of the Metropolitan Region of Campinas. The population is 48,463 (2020 est.) in an area of 108.82 km². The elevation is 590 m. The town is located 138 km from the capital. It is called "Flor da Porcelana" (Porcelain Flower) because of its porcelain related commerce.
Pedreira was founded in 1896. It is linearly distributed on Jaguari River banks. The name of the town comes from the name "Pedro", present in the most male members of the founder's family, Colonel João Pedro de Godoy Moreira. Pedreira offers as main attraction its large porcelain, glasses, wood crafts, aluminium, decoration pieces commerce, with shops especialized in tourist service.

References

Municipalities in São Paulo (state)
Populated places established in 1896